Orogastrura is a genus of springtails in the family Hypogastruridae. There are about eight described species in Orogastrura.

Species
These eight species belong to the genus Orogastrura:
 Orogastrura dilatata (Cassagnau, 1959) i c g
 Orogastrura emucronata Deharveng & Gers, 1979 i c g
 Orogastrura fusca Gers, 1981 i c g
 Orogastrura octoseta Arbea & Jordana, 1990 i c g
 Orogastrura pallida (Cassagnau, 1954) i c g
 Orogastrura parva (Gisin, 1949) i c g
 Orogastrura stebaevae Babenko in Babenko, Chernova, Potapov & Stebaeva, 1994 i c g
 Orogastrura tetrophthalma Deharveng, Bedos & Duran, 2015 g
Data sources: i = ITIS, c = Catalogue of Life, g = GBIF, b = Bugguide.net

References

Further reading

 
 
 

Collembola